West Helena is the western portion of Helena-West Helena, Arkansas, a city in Phillips County, Arkansas, United States. As of the 2000 census, this portion of the city population was 8,689.

Historically, West Helena and its sister city Helena, located on the Mississippi River, have been two of the focal points in the history of the development of the blues. The cities consolidated on January 1, 2006. Helena is the birthplace of Arkansas' former senior United States senator, Blanche Lincoln.

Geography
West Helena is located at  (34.545702, -90.644346).

Demographics
As of the census of 2000, there were 8,689 people, 3,204 households, and 2,223 families residing in West Helena. The racial makeup of West Helena was 32.77% White, 65.69% Black or African American, 0.23% Native American, 0.38% Asian, 0.02% Pacific Islander, 0.33% from other races, and 0.58% from two or more races. 1.01% of the population were Hispanic or Latino of any race.

There were 3,204 households, out of which 36.0% had children under the age of 18 living with them, 36.8% were married couples living together, 29.2% had a female householder with no husband present, and 30.6% were non-families. 27.6% of all households were made up of individuals, and 11.5% had someone living alone who was 65 years of age or older. The average household size was 2.71 and the average family size was 3.32.

In West Helena, the population was spread out, with 34.1% under the age of 18, 10.1% from 18 to 24, 23.9% from 25 to 44, 19.6% from 45 to 64, and 12.3% who were 65 years of age or older. The median age was 30 years. For every 100 females, there were 80.7 males. For every 100 females age 18 and over, there were 71.5 males.

The median income for a household in West Helena was $21,130, and the median income for a family was $25,014. Males had a median income of $22,971 versus $17,225 for females. The per capita income for West Helena was $11,234. About 30.9% of families and 35.4% of the population were below the poverty line, including 49.5% of those under age 18 and 27.2% of those age 65 or over.

Education
Helena-West Helena School District operates schools in what was West Helena.

Schools in the former West Helena.
 Central High School
 Eliza Miller Junior High School
 Beechcrest Elementary School
 Westside Elementary School
 Woodruff Elementary School

Climate
The climate in this area is characterized by hot, humid summers and generally mild to cool winters. According to the Köppen Climate Classification system, West Helena has a humid subtropical climate, abbreviated "Cfa" on climate maps.

Notable people
Anthony Boone, college basketball coach for Central Arkansas
Angie Craig (born 1972), American politician 
Odessa Harris (1936–2007), American singer
Lonnie Shields (born 1956), American singer, songwriter, and guitarist
William Warfield (1920-2002), Singer and movie actor

References

External links

 2000 U.S. Census maps: Index and pages 1 and 2
 1990 U.S. Census map of Phillips County (index map) indicates West Helena on pages 3, 4, 8, and D pages 1, 2, 3, 4, 5, and 6
The Helena-West Helena Daily World, the newspaper serving Helena-West Helena and Phillips County

Former municipalities in Arkansas
Micropolitan areas of Arkansas
Populated places in Phillips County, Arkansas
Populated places disestablished in 2006